"Hey, Soul Sister" is a song by American rock band Train. It was written by lead singer Pat Monahan, Amund Bjørklund, and Espen Lind. It was released as the lead single from the band's fifth studio album, Save Me, San Francisco (2009).

The song reached number three on the Billboard Hot 100 chart and is Train's highest-charting song to date. As of September 21, 2012, it had sold over 6 million digital copies in the US. It was the top-selling song on the iTunes Store in 2010, and the second overall best-selling song in the US in 2010. It is also the band's most commercially successful single to date, reaching number one in 16 countries. The single received a 6× platinum certification by the Recording Industry Association of America (RIAA) on September 21, 2012, signifying sales of over 6 million copies. The live iTunes version of "Hey, Soul Sister" garnered a Grammy Award for Best Pop Performance by a Duo or Group with Vocals at the 53rd Annual Grammy Awards. The song was not eligible for any Grammy Award in the General Field.

Background
After collaborating with the Norwegian production duo Espionage (Espen Lind and Amund Bjørklund) in the writing and recording of the track "Brick by Brick", Train's lead singer Pat Monahan decided to record another track with the duo.

Composition

"Hey, Soul Sister" is a mid-tempo pop rock song. Written in the key of E major, the beat is set in common time and composed in a tempo of 97 bpm. The song is characterized by a signature pattern played on a ukulele, that follows a basic E5 – B – C#m – A (I5 – V – vi – IV) progression in the verse, tag and bridge, switching to an A – B – E5 – B (IV – V – I5 – V) progression in the chorus. The song's chord structure is arranged in an A B A B A B A form. It rhymes "sister" with "Mr. Mister."

Lyrically, Stafford admitted the inspiration for the song came about while Monahan was imagining what Burning Man must be like, and started penning lyrics inspired by the imagery he saw:

Monahan has since confirmed this in several radio interviews.

Critical reception
"Hey, Soul Sister" has seen mixed reviews from music critics.

Positive reviews
Scott Mervis, writing for the Pittsburgh Post-Gazette, praised the song as a welcome comeback from the band's hiatus, calling the track "joyous" and "bouncy".

The writer for Eclectic Music Lover listed the song as #37 on his "100 Best Songs of the 2010s" list, praising its lyrics as "heartwarming" and "guaranteed to bring a smile to even the dourest face." The writer also called the music video "charming."

Negative reviews
The Village Voice derided the song, quipping "'Hey Soul Sister' is an orgy where bad ideas trade STDs, and the most syphilitic brain-fart stumbled in drunk from a Smash Mouth show ... From Smash Mouth, Train picked up an earworm that burrowed into society's asshole, laid 4.7 million iTunes eggs, and gave birth to a grey cloud of banality that covers the Earth." Similarly, Mother Jones stated "there is less soul in the entirety of Train than in the palest single member of Collective Soul. 'Hey, Soul Sister' is soul for people who refer to peanut butter and jelly as 'soul food.' It makes the California Raisins look like the second coming of Sly and the Family Stone. It's so white, Sarah Palin just named it her running mate for 2012." 

In a tamer review, Business Insider named "Hey, Soul Sister" the worst song of 2010 describing the song as a "saccharine, falsettoed ear-bleeder." LA Weekly took aim at Pat Monahan's lyrical content, awarding "Hey, Soul Sister" places two through ten in its Top 10 worst lyrics of 2010 list.

In a review of Purity, Slate writer Ruther Graham criticized its final pages, which contain a scene about "Hey Soul Sister", and the titular character Purity Tyler calling it a "great song." Graham strongly opposed the song and its lyrical content and called the scene the worst part of the novel.

Music video
The video was filmed in front of Chango Coffee at the corner of Morton Ave and Echo Park Ave. in Echo Park, Los Angeles, California. The video intercuts images of Train singing with a woman (Kiana Bessa Chastain) walking around her apartment and a man (actor Andrew Craghan) painting the words to the song on the landscape. Eventually the two meet each other in the street in front of the band.

Appearances in other media

Train performed the song on the show Red Eye w/ Greg Gutfeld on Fox News which aired during the early morning broadcast on April 20, 2010. They have also performed the song on numerous talk shows, including The Tonight Show with Jay Leno, Live with Regis and Kelly, The Ellen DeGeneres Show, Lopez Tonight, and The Howard Stern Show. They also performed the song before the 2010 Major League Baseball Home Run Derby on ESPN. Train performed the song at Dick Clark's New Year's Rockin' Eve 2011.

It has also been played in several TV shows as CSI: NY in the episode "Second Chances", Hellcats in its first episode, and Medium in chapter 6x03 "Pain Killer". It has also been played in the Canadian TV show Being Erica, in chapter 3x11. "Hey, Soul Sister" can also be heard on "Ko'olauloa", the sixth episode of Hawaii Five-0, where it was sung and played live by Aidan James.

The song was performed on ABC's Dancing with the Stars on May 4, 2010, and on America's Got Talent on July 21, 2010.  A cover of the song was also performed by "Munch's Make Believe Band," the animatronic show located at Chuck E. Cheese's restaurants. The Dixie Chicks covered this song while on their 2010 tour with The Eagles.

In Fox's TV musical-comedy series Glee the song has been covered in the ninth episode of season two, "Special Education" (aired November 30, 2010) by actor Darren Criss (as his character Blaine Anderson) singing the solo in a performance with the fictional show choir Dalton Academy Warblers (voiced by all-male a cappella group Beelzebubs).

"Hey, Soul Sister" was also covered by 2010 X Factor Australia winner Altiyan Childs for his self-titled debut album. Also in Australia, it was performed by Robbie Anderson on The Voice Kids. The song was performed by Street Corner Symphony on the second season of the television show The Sing-Off during episode 2: "Songs From The Past 5 Years".  In 2010, the dance troupe from Strictly Come Dancing performed a quickstep to the song and it was used in a Samsung 3D TV commercial.

Chart performance
"Hey, Soul Sister" debuted at #98 on the Billboard Hot 100 for the week ended October 17, 2009, becoming their first charting single in five years. On the week of January 30, 2010, in its 16th week on the Hot 100 chart, "Hey, Soul Sister" leaped to #7 from #23 on an 81% digital single sales increase from the previous week, thus becoming Train's second career Top Ten hit on the chart. It reached #3 on the Billboard Hot 100 in the week of April 10, 2010, and it is their highest on the chart to date, even surpassing their 2001 hit, "Drops of Jupiter", which peaked at #5. The song climbed to #1 on the Hot Digital Songs chart for the week of April 10, 2010, and stayed in the top spot for three weeks. As of the January 20, 2011, issue of Billboard, "Hey, Soul Sister" had spent 22 weeks at number one on the Adult Contemporary chart.

The single sold 687,000 copies in 2009 which made it that year's #131 song. It went on to sell 3,319,000 more units in the first half of 2010 and 42 weeks after its release still stood at number 16 on the Hot 100 chart. By the end of December 2010, it had sold 4,310,000 digital copies, becoming the second biggest selling digital song of that year. By the end of January 2011, it had sold over 5 million digital copies. As of January 2014, the song had sold 6,417,000 digital units in the United States, one of the biggest-selling digital singles by a rock band since Nielsen SoundScan began tracking download sales in 2003.

BNA Records, a country music label owned by Sony Music, released the song to the country music format in June 2010. It debuted at #60 on the Hot Country Songs charts for the week ended July 10, 2010.

In addition to revitalizing Train's career in their native country, "Hey, Soul Sister" has also become a big international hit; it was #1 on the official Dutch and Australian singles charts for 7 weeks and 4 weeks, respectively, and also became their first Irish number one single. The single charted at #2 in New Zealand (their highest in the country to date), and reached #3 on both the Canadian and Belgian singles charts.

On April 24, 2010, "Hey, Soul Sister" debuted on the UK Singles Chart at #64, marking the band's first appearance on the chart since "She's On Fire" reached a peak of #49 in 2001. On May 2, 2010, the single climbed into the UK Top 40 at #36 and has since reached a peak of #18. It has been in the official charts for 79 weeks. In Canada the song became the sixth-best-selling of 2010 with 244,000 copies.

Track listing

Digital download
 "Hey, Soul Sister" – 3:36

Digital download — remixes
 "Hey, Soul Sister" (Karmatronic Radio Edit) – 3:40
 "Hey, Soul Sister" (Karmatronic Club Mix) – 6:45
 "Hey, Soul Sister" (Karmatronic Instrumental) – 6:45
 "Hey, Soul Sister" (Karmatronic Performance) - 3:23 
 Hey, Soul Sister (Psyrex Remix) - 3:42

Digital download — country version
 "Hey, Soul Sister" (Country Mix) – 3:35

CD single
 "Hey, Soul Sister" – 3:36
 "The Finish Line" (Patrick Monahan, Sacha Skarbek) – 3:46

Credits and personnel
Recording
Recorded at Kensaltown Recording Studios, London, England, Quad Studios, New York City and at Sound City Studios, Los Angeles, California, United States
Mixed at Indian River Studios, Merritt Island, Florida, United States
Mastered at Sterling Sound, New York City, New York, United States

Personnel

Pat Monahan – songwriter, vocals
Espen Lind – songwriter, producer, recording, ukulele, keyboards
Amund Bjørklund – songwriter, producer, recording
Martin Terefe – producer, bass
Gregg Wattenberg – additional producer
Dyre Gormsen – recording
Bryan Cook – recording
Ross Petersen – recording
Iain Hill – assistant engineer

Francis Murray – assistant engineer
Claes Bjørklund – keyboards
Jerry Becker – hammond organ
Scott Underwood – drums
Jimmy Stafford – guitar
Mark Endert – mixer
Doug Johnson – assistant mixer
Ted Jensen – mastering

Charts

Weekly charts

Monthly charts

Year-end charts

Decade-end charts

All-time charts

Certifications

Release history

See also
 List of best-selling singles in Australia
List of Billboard Adult Contemporary number ones of 2010
List of Billboard Adult Contemporary number ones of 2011

References

External links
Official Music Video

2009 singles
2009 songs
APRA Award winners
Columbia Records singles
Irish Singles Chart number-one singles
Number-one singles in Australia
Song recordings produced by Espionage (production team)
Songs written by Amund Bjørklund
Songs written by Espen Lind
Songs written by Pat Monahan
Sony Music singles
Train (band) songs
Animated music videos